The Henderson fruit dove (Ptilinopus insularis), also known as scarlet-capped fruit dove, is a species of bird in the family Columbidae. It is endemic to Henderson Island in the South Pacific Pitcairn Island group.

Its natural habitat is tropical moist lowland scrub forest, which it formerly shared with three other endemic species of pigeon, now extinct.

References

External links
BirdLife Species Factsheet.

Henderson fruit dove
Birds of Henderson Island
Henderson fruit dove
Henderson fruit dove
Taxonomy articles created by Polbot